Proncycroy is a settlement in the Sutherland region in the Scottish council area of Highland, and is located less than two miles from Dornoch.

Populated places in Sutherland